Burgschwalbach is a municipality in the district of Rhein-Lahn, in Rhineland-Palatinate, in western Germany. It belongs to the association community of Aar-Einrich.

The Schwalbach Castle was built between 1354 and 1371 by Count Eberhard V. of Katzenelnbogen. Gilbrecht of Schönborn was mentioned as the count's burgmann in 1373. In the 16th century, Burgschwalbach passed to the  County of Nassau.

References

Municipalities in Rhineland-Palatinate
Rhein-Lahn-Kreis